Sylvie Hue is a French classical clarinetist.

Biography 
After having pursued musical and literary studies at the Paris 12 Val de Marne University and at the Conservatoire de Paris, this student of Guy Deplus and Christian Lardé obtained a First prize for clarinet unanimously in 1987 and a first prize for chamber music in 1988.

First prize at the Tokyo International Competition in 1988, laureate of the Prague International Competition in 1991, she became the first soloist with the Garde républicaine of Paris orchestra. She performs in recital and with orchestra in France and around the world, especially in Japan. With pianist Frédérique Lagarde, she also plays regularly as a duo and is at the origin of the "Trio Paronyme".

Many renowned composer, including Pierre Ancelin, Roger Boutry, Graciane Finzi and Armando Ghidoni, have dedicated concertante and chamber music works to her.

Selected discography 
 La clarinette de la Belle Époque, vol. I & Il -, piano: Roger Boutry, REM (Polygram) 311209 XCD/ 311295 XCD
 Carl Maria von Weber's Concerto n° 1, Orchestre d'harmonie de la Force Aérienne Belge, Robert Martin publisher RM 08956 IL 660
 Armando Ghidoni's Concerto pour clarinette et orchestre à cordes, Éditions Pizzicato Pizz 04 
 Breeze on the sea (British repertoire for clarinet and piano), piano: Roger Boutry, Édition Syrius (Coda) Syr 141349
 Contre-Chant, duo with Frédérique Lagarde (piano), works by Francis Poulenc, Jacques Castérède, Roger Boutry, Nicolas Bacri and Pierre Sancan, Le Chant de Linos, CL 0939

Bibliography 
 L'Apprenti clarinettiste vol. 1 and 2 – , 1995 
 150 ans de musique à la Garde républicaine, La Nouvelle Arche de Noé, 1998 
 18 études ethniques, Editions Combre, 2004

References

External links 
 Sylvie Hue on Vandoren-fr.com
 
 

French classical clarinetists
Conservatoire de Paris alumni
Date of birth missing (living people)
Place of birth missing (living people)
Year of birth missing (living people)
Living people
21st-century clarinetists